Tucker County is a county in the U.S. state of West Virginia. As of the 2020 census, the population was 6,762, making it West Virginia's fourth-least populous county. Its county seat is Parsons. The county was created in 1856 from a part of Randolph County, then part of Virginia.  In 1871, a small part of Barbour County, was transferred to Tucker County. The county was named after Henry St. George Tucker, Sr., a judge and Congressman from Williamsburg, Virginia.

History
Tucker County was created in 1856 from a part of Randolph County, then part of Virginia.  In 1861, as a result of the Wheeling Convention, Tucker County joined the rest of West Virginia in breaking away from Virginia to remain a part of the Union.

In 1863, West Virginia's counties were divided into civil townships, with the intention of encouraging local government.  This proved impractical in the heavily rural state, and in 1872 the townships were converted into magisterial districts.  Tucker County was initially divided into three townships: Black Fork, Hannahsville, and St. George, which became magisterial districts in 1872.  The following year, Hannahsville became Licking District, and in 1876, two new magisterial districts were formed: Clover from part of St. George, and Dry Fork from part of Black Fork.  A sixth district, Fairfax, was organized in the 1880s, followed by a seventh, Davis, formed in the 1890s from parts of Dry Fork and Fairfax Districts.

Between 1889 and '93, a dispute known as the Tucker County Seat War took place between the people in the town of Parsons and that of St. George, over the location of the county seat. Although nobody was killed in the "war", the situation came to a climax when a mob of armed men from Parsons marched on St. George and took the county records by force.

Beginning in 1907, the Babcock Lumber Company of Pittsburgh, Pennsylvania, while operating out of Davis, West Virginia, clear cut the mountain ridges throughout Tucker Country. This clear cutting, with its residual slashings, converted the landscape into a "tinderbox". By 1910, fires burned continuously — in some areas for years on end, from spring until the first snows — leaving little other than thin mineral soil and bare rock. In 1914, with the county virtually denuded of standing trees, the ground burned continually for 6 months. As a result, top soils that once produced huge timbers on the mountainsides — including the largest tree ever harvested in West Virginia, a white oak some 13 feet in diameter just 10 feet from the ground — washed down into the narrow valleys and bottom lands, which had always been too narrow for harvesting productive crops or livestock. Uncontrollable soil erosion and flooding further degraded and depopulated the region. To this day, Tucker County and surrounding regions bear the scars of this remarkable conflagration.

Geography

Major highways
  U.S. Highway 219
  West Virginia Route 32
  West Virginia Route 38
  West Virginia Route 72
  West Virginia Route 90
  West Virginia Route 93
WV 48

Adjacent counties
 Preston County (north)
 Grant County (east)
 Randolph County (south)
 Barbour County (west)

State parks
 Blackwater Falls State Park
 Canaan Valley Resort State Park
 Fairfax Stone State Park

Federal lands
 Canaan Valley National Wildlife Refuge
 Dolly Sods Wilderness
 Fernow Experimental Forest
 Monongahela National Forest

National Natural Landmarks
 Big Run Bog
 Canaan Valley
 Fisher Spring Run Bog

Demographics

2000 census
As of the census of 2000, there were 7,321 people, 3,052 households, and 2,121 families living in the county.  The population density was 18 people per square mile (7/km2).  There were 4,634 housing units at an average density of 11 per square mile (4/km2).  The racial makeup of the county was 98.85% White, 0.07% Black or African American, 0.19% Native American, 0.01% Asian, 0.12% Pacific Islander, 0.10% from other races, and 0.66% from two or more races.  0.25% of the population were Hispanic or Latino of any race.

There were 3,052 households, out of which 27.00% had children under the age of 18 living with them, 58.00% were married couples living together, 7.80% had a female householder with no husband present, and 30.50% were non-families. 27.20% of all households were made up of individuals, and 13.60% had someone living alone who was 65 years of age or older.  The average household size was 2.35 and the average family size was 2.84.

In the county, the population was spread out, with 21.30% under the age of 18, 6.70% from 18 to 24, 26.40% from 25 to 44, 27.70% from 45 to 64, and 17.90% who were 65 years of age or older.  The median age was 42 years. For every 100 females there were 95.20 males.  For every 100 females age 18 and over, there were 94.10 males.

The median income for a household in the county was $26,250, and the median income for a family was $32,574. Males had a median income of $24,149 versus $17,642 for females. The per capita income for the county was $16,349.  About 14.90% of families and 18.10% of the population were below the poverty line, including 24.30% of those under age 18 and 15.50% of those age 65 or over.

2010 census
As of the 2010 United States census, there were 7,141 people, 3,057 households, and 2,052 families living in the county. The racial makeup of the county was 98.7% white, 0.2% American Indian, 0.2% black or African American, 0.1% Asian, 0.1% from other races, and 0.6% from two or more races. Those of Hispanic or Latino origin made up 0.6% of the population. In terms of ancestry, 30.3% were German, 15.7% were Irish, 8.1% were American, 7.9% were English, and 5.8% were Dutch.

Of the 3,057 households, 25.3% had children under the age of 18 living with them, 55.1% were married couples living together, 7.5% had a female householder with no husband present, 32.9% were non-families, and 28.3% of all households were made up of individuals. The average household size was 2.29 and the average family size was 2.77. The median age was 46.3 years.

The median income for a household in the county was $32,712 and the median income for a family was $43,307. Males had a median income of $34,321 versus $22,938 for females. The per capita income for the county was $20,020. About 12.9% of families and 17.7% of the population were below the poverty line, including 20.3% of those under age 18 and 20.7% of those age 65 or over.

Politics
Tucker County was divided at the time of the Virginia Secession Convention, and has been a consistent statewide bellwether, voting for the winner of West Virginia's electoral votes in every presidential election since the state's formation, except that of 1912, when it voted for Theodore Roosevelt.

Communities

Cities
 Parsons (county seat)
 Thomas

Towns
 Davis
 Hambleton
 Hendricks

Magisterial districts
 Black Fork
 Clover
 Davis
 Dry Fork
 Fairfax
 Licking
 St. George

Census-designated place
 St. George

Unincorporated communities

 Auvil
 Benbush
 Bretz
 Canaan Heights
 Coketon
 Cortland
 Douglas
 Dryfork
 Elk
 Gladwin
 Hannahsville
 Holly Meadows
 Hovatter
 Jenningston
 Laneville
 Lead Mine
 Location
 Mackeyville
 Moore
 Pierce
 Pleasant Run
 Pleasant Vale
 Porterwood
 Red Creek
 Shafer
 William

Notable residents
 Tony Tonelli, football player. Tonelli, who was shunned by the West Virginia University football program because of his Italian heritage, became a three-time letterman for the USC Trojans. In his final season Tonelli blocked a punt deep in Duke territory that led to the winning touchdown in the 1939 Rose Bowl. The first player ever to be drafted into the NFL from USC, Tonelli completed one season with the Detroit Lions in 1939. He earned his nickname, "Two Ton" Tonelli, while growing up in Thomas, West Virginia.

See also
 National Register of Historic Places listings in Tucker County, West Virginia
 Tucker County Seat War

References

Specific

General
 Fansler, Homer Floyd (1962), History of Tucker County, West Virginia, Parsons, West Virginia: McClain Printing Company.
 Maxwell, Hu, History of Tucker County, West Virginia, from the Earliest Explorations and Settlements to the Present Time; with Biographical Sketches of more than Two Hundred and Fifty of the Leading Men, and a Full Appendix of Official and Electoral History; Also, an Account of the Rivers, Forests and Caves of the County, Preston Publishing Company: Kingwood, West Virginia, 1884. (Reprinted by McClain Printing Company, Parsons, W.Va., 1971 and 1993.)

External links
 

 
West Virginia counties on the Potomac River
1856 establishments in Virginia
Populated places established in 1856
Counties of Appalachia